Gorham High School, is a public high school located in Gorham, Maine, United States. It houses grades 9–12. The school, in its current building, opened in 1959 and was renovated in 1971-72 and from 1993-1995.

The current principal is Brian Jandreau, with Christina Cifelli and Marc Sawyer serving as assistant principals. It usually enrolls around 800-870 students per year.

Athletics
Gorham High School is in Class A and B in the athletic classes in Maine. The school offers Alpine Skiing, Baseball, Basketball, Cheerleading, Cross Country, Field Hockey, Football, Golf, Ice Hockey, Indoor & Outdoor Track, Lacrosse, Soccer, Softball, Swimming, Tennis, Volleyball and Wrestling (as a Co-Op with Scarborough). The Athletic Director is Timothy Spear.

MPA state championships 
The school has a total of 49 state championships (Last year won/last appearance):

 Baseball - 2 (2005/2018)
 Boys Basketball - 4  (2000/2005) 
 Girls Basketball - 8 (2017/2018)
 Cheerleading - 1 (2001) 
 Boys Cross Country - 2 (1971)
 Field Hockey - 4 (1999/2006)
 Golf - 4 (2016)
 Girls Soccer - 4 (2007/2016) 
 Boys Soccer - 7 (1981/2018)
 Softball - 4 (1996/2005)
 Boys Tennis - 2 (2013)
 Girls Outdoor Track - 6 (1983) 
 Boys Outdoor Track - 1 (2005)

Maine state Gatorade players of the year 

 2019- Mackenzie Holmes Girls Basketball - Attending Indiana University 
2018 - Grace McGouldrick Softball  - Currently playing Softball at University of Maine 
 2017 - Emily Esposito Girls Basketball  - Currently playing Basketball at Boston University 
 2008 - Justin Villacci Football  
 2008 - Rachele Burns Girls Soccer  - Played Basketball at University of Maine 
 2007 - Kelsey Wilson Girls Soccer  - Played Soccer at University of Maine 
 2000 - Noel Beagle Girls Track and Field  - Played Basketball at Yale University

Co-Curricular
Gorham High School has a huge Co-Curricular program. The school offers these activities for students to participate in: School Council, Student Council, Pi-Cone Math Team, French Club, Spanish Club, Prom Committee, Drama, National Honor Society, Civil Rights Team, Key Club, Robotics, Rainbow League, INTERACT, Rock Climbing/Outing Club, Game Club, Teen Trendsetters, Model United Nations, Book Club, Ambassadors' Club, Youth in Government, Intramurals, Odyssey of the Mind, Equestrian Club, Youth Court, Comedy Club, Dream Factory Club, Writing Club, Badminton Club, GirlUP, Film Club, Green Team, Studio Club, Debate Team, Fishing Club, Video Production Club, and Eco Club.

Gorham High School has the only high school chapter of Dream Factory in Maine.

The school's student published yearbook is named 'Schola.'

Notable faculty
Robert Crowley - Winner of Survivor: Gabon (taught Science)
Adam Parvanta - Winner of 2019 Milken Educator Award - Technology Education/Integrator

Notable alumni 
Peter Mills - member of the Maine Senate, 1996-2010 (Class of 1961)

References

External links

Gorham, Maine
Public high schools in Maine
High schools in Cumberland County, Maine